The World's Greatest Lover is a 1977 American comedy film directed, written by and starring Gene Wilder, and co-starring Carol Kane and Dom DeLuise. It is a tribute/spoof of classic silent comedies and "old Hollywood" of the 1920s, specifically the popularity of romantic icon Rudolph Valentino.

Plot

In the silent film era, Rainbow Studios executives figure they are losing revenue to a rival studio because they don't have Rudolph Valentino.  Led by studio head Adolph Zitz, they decide to hold a contest for the World's Greatest Lover in order to find a star to combat Valentino's popularity.

Rudy Hickman is a neurotic baker from Milwaukee, but aspires to become a Hollywood star.  His entry into the contest tests his marriage, and his neuroses manifest in his screen test, where he nearly kills his fellow actress.  Surprisingly, this behavior scores favorably with Zitz and the studio executives reviewing his performance. Now calling himself "Rudy Valentine," he gets a slot in the final phase of the contest, just after finding his wife Annie has left him.

Cast
 Gene Wilder as Rudy Hickman/Rudy Valentine
 Carol Kane as Annie Hickman
 Dom DeLuise as Adolph Zitz
 Fritz Feld as Tomaso Abalone
 Ronny Graham as the Director
 Danny DeVito as Assistant Director
 Rolfe Sedan as Train Conductor

Production

The railroad scenes when Valentine and his wife travel from Milwaukee to Hollywood were filmed on the Sierra Railroad in Tuolumne County, California.

Release
The world premiere of The World's Greatest Lover took place in New York, on December 16, 1977. It was screened in Los Angeles on December 18, 1977 and released in the United States nationwide, by 20th Century Fox.

Home media
The film was originally released in many countries on VHS. 20th Century Fox released the film on DVD in April 2006 with two special features; an audio commentary with Gene Wilder and the original theatrical trailer.

Reception

Critical response
Critics who compared it to Wilder's earlier works with Mel Brooks were left largely unimpressed by the film, feeling it was not as balanced as previous works, and felt more excessive.

Vincent Canby of The New York Times described the film as not only "frequently side-splitting," but "uncommonly handsome" for a comedy, "the period sets and costumes having a lot of the fantasy quality of a stylish Broadway musical." Arthur D. Murphy of Variety called the film "a good period comedy," adding, "This time the individual sketchpieces ... emerge as varyingly humorous episodes strung out on a skimpy story line." Gene Siskel of the Chicago Tribune gave the film 2 stars out of 4 and reported, "I rarely laughed or even smiled during 'The World's Greatest Lover.' Quite the contrary, I found it depressing, because at the same time I wasn't laughing I realized that Wilder, one of the screen's finest bittersweet comic actors, seems hell-bent on a directing career. Therefore, to see 'The World's Greatest Lover' is to be filled with a sense of loss, the loss of seeing less of Wilder in Brooks' films or films other than his own." Gary Arnold of The Washington Post called the film "not very clever at all" and wrote, "The prevailing tone of 'Lover' is shrill wretched excess, in both slapstick and sentimental passages." Clyde Jeavons of The Monthly Film Bulletin wrote, "On top of its statutory, and for the most part uninspired slapstick, the film borrows freely from many of Hollywood's more anarchic comedians, from the Marx Brothers to Jerry Lewis, but never accurately enough to give the audience the satisfaction of recognition. Most unsettling of all is Wilder's own brand of rampaging comic hysteria, which here goes disastrously unchecked ... and augmented by the similar excesses of Dom DeLuise, Fritz Feld and Carl Ballantine, generates more decibels than laughs."

Box office
Despite the negative reception, the film was a commercial success. Produced on a budget of $4.8 million, the film grossed $21 million at the box office, earning $9.9 million US theatrical rentals. It was the 25th highest grossing film of 1977.

References

External links

1977 films
1977 comedy films
1970s parody films
1970s English-language films
20th Century Fox films
American comedy films
American parody films
Cultural depictions of Rudolph Valentino
Films about Hollywood, Los Angeles
Films directed by Gene Wilder
Films scored by John Morris
Films set in the 1920s
Films with screenplays by Gene Wilder
1970s American films